Nära mej, nära dej is the third studio album by Swedish singer Sanna Nielsen, released on February 15, 2006. It peaked at number 12 on the Swedish Albums Chart. The opening track "Rör vid min själ" is "You Raise Me Up" with lyrics in Swedish.

Track listing
Rör vid min själ (You Raise Me Up)
Nära mej
Vägen hem
Mitt drömda land
Koppången
En okänd värld
Där mitt hjärta för evigt bor
Jag är
I natt
Om du var min
Allt som du är
Härifrån till evigheten
I morgonens ljus

Charts

External links

 "Nära mej nära dej" at the Swedish album chart

2006 albums
Sanna Nielsen albums
Swedish-language albums